Anna Vaughn Hyatt Huntington (March 10, 1876 – October 4, 1973) was an American sculptor who was among New York City's most prominent sculptors in the early 20th century. At a time when very few women were successful artists, she had a thriving career. Hyatt Huntington exhibited often, traveled widely, received critical acclaim at home and abroad, and won multiple awards and commissions.

During the first two decades of the 20th century, Hyatt Huntington became famous for her animal sculptures, which combine vivid emotional depth with skillful realism. In 1915, she created the first public monument by a woman to be erected in New York City. Her Joan of Arc, located on Riverside Drive at 93rd Street, is the city's first monument dedicated to a historical woman.

Biography

Huntington was born in Cambridge, Massachusetts, on March 10, 1876. She was the daughter of Audella Beebe and Alpheus Hyatt, a professor of paleontology and zoology at Harvard University and MIT. Her father encouraged her early interest in animals and animal anatomy. Anna Hyatt first studied with Henry Hudson Kitson in Boston, who threw her out after she identified equine anatomical deficiencies in his work (Rubenstein 1990). Later she studied with Hermon Atkins MacNeil and Gutzon Borglum at the Art Students League of New York. In addition to these formal studies, she spent many hours making extensive study of animals in various zoos (including the Bronx Zoo) and circuses.

Her work was entered in the sculpture event in the art competition at the 1928 Summer Olympics. In 1932, Huntington became one of the earliest woman artists to be elected to the American Academy of Arts and Letters.  She was one of 250 sculptors who exhibited in the 3rd Sculpture International held in the summer of 1949 at the Philadelphia Museum of Art.

In 1927 Huntington contracted tuberculosis. She struggled with it for a decade but survived the illness.

Huntington married Archer Milton Huntington on March 10, 1923. They founded Brookgreen Gardens near Georgetown, South Carolina, incorporating Brookgreen Plantation, which was started in the late 18th century and was a major antebellum plantation. This property was listed on the National Register of Historic Places in 1978 and designated as a National Historic Landmark District in 1992.

Hyatt Huntington was a member of the National Academy of Design and the National Sculpture Society (NSS). She and her husband donated $100,000 to underwrite the NSS Exhibition of 1929. Because of her husband's enormous wealth and the shared interests of the couple, the Huntingtons founded fourteen museums and four wildlife preserves. They also donated the land for the Collis P. Huntington State Park to the State of Connecticut.

Anna Vaughn Hyatt Huntington died October 4, 1973, in Redding, Connecticut. She is buried in Woodlawn Cemetery, The Bronx, New York City.

Legacy
Hyatt Huntington's papers are held at Syracuse University, and the Archives of American Art of the Smithsonian Institution.

The Metropolitan Museum of Art ranks Huntington as among the foremost woman sculptors in the United States to have undertaken large, publicly commissioned works, alongside Malvina Hoffman and Evelyn Beatrice Longman.

She was the maternal aunt of the art historian A. Hyatt Mayor.

Public equestrian monuments

Hyatt Huntington's animal sculptures, figures both life-sized and in smaller proportions, are held in museums and collections throughout the United States. Her work is displayed in many of New York's leading institutions and outdoor spaces, including Columbia University, the Metropolitan Museum of Art, the National Academy of Design, the New-York Historical Society, the Hispanic Society of America, the Cathedral of St. John the Divine, Central Park, Riverside Park and the Bronx Zoo. She spent two years collaborating with Abastenia St. Leger Eberle to produce Man and Bull, which was exhibited at the St. Louis Exposition in 1904.

The Hispanic Society of America was founded in 1904 by her husband, Archie Huntington. Hyatt Huntington created the sculptures and fittings in its courtyard, 
including:
bronze statue, El Cid (1927) There are also editions of this sculpture in: Seville and Valencia, Spain; Lincoln Park, San Francisco; Balboa Park, San Diego (El Cid Campeador); and Buenos Aires, Argentina
four bronze Castilian warriors arranged around the El Cid statue,
bronze flagpole bases,
limestone bas-relief of Don Quixote, the hero of the novel by Cervantes; and
limestone bas-relief of Boabdil, the last Moorish king of Spain.

She created two statues that are located at the entrance to Collis P. Huntington State Park in Redding and Bethel, Connecticut: Mother Bear and Cubs and Sculpture of Wolves. The park was donated to the state of Connecticut by the Huntingtons. Other equestrian statues by Huntington greet visitors to the entrance to Redding Elementary School, the John Read Middle School, and at the Mark Twain Library. The statue at the elementary school is called Fighting Stallions and the one at the middle school is called A Tribute to the Workhorse. The sculpture at the Mark Twain Library, also called The Torch Bearers, is identical in form to the one in Madrid, but is cast in bronze and appears to be smaller.

In her Horse Trainer (Balboa Park, San Diego) she enlivens the theme of the Roman marble Horse Tamers of the Quirinale, Rome, which had been taken up by Guillaume Coustou for the horses of Marly.

Huntington's Joan of Arc stands at the intersection of Riverside Drive and Ninety-third Street in Manhattan. It commemorated the 500th anniversary of the birth of Joan of Arc and honored France, which was at war. Its unveiling catapulted Huntington into the international spotlight. Mina Edison, Thomas Edison's second wife, participated. Replicas of the statue are found:
San Francisco, in front of the Legion of Honor (museum) in Lincoln Park.
The Battlefields Park, Quebec City, Canada.
Blois, France.
Cast in 1921 and included as part of a memorial to locals who fought in World War I, located on Legion Square in Gloucester, Massachusetts, not far from Huntington's studio.

Andrew Jackson, A Boy of The Waxhaws, Andrew Jackson State Park, Lancaster, South Carolina, depicts a young Andy Jackson, sitting astride a farm horse. It is a bronze, larger-than-life statue. Usually her horses were noble, prancing, fierce beasts. She made Jackson's horse a gentler animal by fixing the energy and tension of the work on the figure of young Jackson. The sculpture was initiated by a letter from a sixth-grade class at Rice Elementary School in Lancaster, South Carolina, asking Mrs. Huntington if she would sculpt a statue of young Andrew Jackson for the state park. Mrs. Huntington submitted to do so, and replied, in part, "A picture came to mind as I read your letter and I have tried out the composition. I have Jackson as a young man of sixteen or seventeen seated bareback on a farm horse, one hand leaning on the horse's rump and looking over his native hills, to wonder what the future holds for him.  He must have been a good looking and thoughtful boy, wondering what the future might hold, moments we all have from our teens to our nineties."  The statue was completed at her Bethel, Connecticut studio, and was first worked in clay in half the scale of the final statue. Even then, it was necessary for the octogenarian sculptor to use a tall ladder to reach the top.  South Carolina school children responded by donating their nickels and dimes to raise the necessary funds for a massive base to support the statue, which looks out over the large expanse of lawn at the park. County workmen placed the statue on its Lancaster County pink granite base in time for the ceremony marking Andrew Jackson's 200th birthday, in March 1967. This was Huntington's last major work, completed after her ninety-first birthday. The statue is located at Andrew Jackson State Park, about nine miles (14 km) north of Lancaster, South Carolina, just off US 521.

General Israel Putnam, Putnam Memorial Park, Redding, Connecticut, commemorates General Putnam's escape from the British in 1779, when he rode down a cliff at Horseneck Heights in Greenwich, Connecticut. The statue is located at the intersection of Routes 58 and 107 at the entrance to Putnam Park.

Los Portadores de la Antorcha ("The Torch Bearers"), cast aluminum, Ciudad Universitaria Dental School, Madrid, was given to the people of Spain to symbolize the passing of the torch of Western civilization from age to youth; it was unveiled 15 May 1955. Replicas of the statue are on the grounds of:
 The Discovery Museum, Park Avenue in Bridgeport, Connecticut, one mile (1.6 km) south of Merritt Parkway Exit 47 Lindale Park, Houston; cast bronze.
 The Mark Twain Library in Redding, Connecticut, cast bronze.
 Valencia (Spain), close to the University of Valencia (donated in 1964).

Statue of Sybil Ludington to commemorate the 1777 ride of this 16-year-old who is said to have ridden forty miles at night to warn local militia of approaching British troops in response to the burning of Danbury, Connecticut. These accounts, originating from the Ludington family, are questioned by modern scholars. The statue is located on Rt. 52 next to Glenedia Lake in Carmel, New York (1961). Smaller versions of the statue exist on the grounds of the DAR Headquarters in Washington, DC; on the grounds of the public library, Danbury, Connecticut; and in the Elliot and Rosemary Offner museum at Brookgreen Gardens, Murrells Inlet, South Carolina.

A peaceful statue of Abraham Lincoln reading a book, while sitting on a grazing horse is located in front of the Bethel Public Library, Rt. 302 in Bethel, Connecticut. The statue bears the signature, Anna Huntington, with the date of 1961.
The same statue of Abraham Lincoln on horseback is found near the entrance of Lincoln's New Salem State Historic Site, Route 97, Petersburg, Illinois.  In 1964 the sculptor, Anna Hyatt Huntington, gave this bronze statue to the state of Illinois. Depicting a young Lincoln absorbed in studying, it shows a typical scene of Lincoln's life when he lived in this pioneer village between 1831 and 1837.Lincoln's New Salem

Conquering the Wild overlooks the Lions Bridge and Lake Maury at The Mariners' Museum Park in Newport News, Virginia.

Gallery

See also

Atalaya and Brookgreen Gardens, a National Historic Landmark site in South Carolina
 Berkshire Museum, Massachusetts

Notes

References
 Armstrong, Craven, et al., 200 Years of American Sculpture, Whitney Museum of Art, New York, 1976.
 Craven, Wayne, Sculpture in America, Thomas Y. Crowell Co, New York, 1968.
 Evans, Cerinda W., Anna Hyatt Huntington, The Mariners Museum, Newport News, Virginia, 1965.
 - Total pages: 788 
 National Sculpture Society, Contemporary American Sculpture 1929, National Sculpture Society, New York, 1929.
 Opitz, Glenn B, Editor, Mantle Fielding’s Dictionary of American Painters, Sculptors & Engravers, Apollo Book, Poughkeepsie, New York, 1986.
 Proske, Beatrice Gilman, Brookgreen Gardens Sculpture,  Brookgreen Gardens, South Carolina, 1968.
 Rubenstein, Charlotte Streifer, American Women Sculptors, G.K. Hall & Co., Boston, 1990.
 - Total pages: 128 
 Leary, Joseph, A Shared Landscape: A Guide & History of Connecticut's State Parks & Forests, Friends of Connecticut State Parks Inc., Hartford, CT, 2004.

External links

 Anna Hyatt Huntington Papers at Syracuse University
 Oral history interview with Anna Hyatt-Huntington, (c. 1964)
 Goddess, Heroine, Beast: Anna Hyatt Huntington's New York Sculpture, 1902–1936 (exhibition), January 22 – March 15, 2014, the Miriam and Ira D. Wallach Art Gallery, Columbia University
 Brookgreen Gardens, at Murrells Inlet, South Carolina

1876 births
1973 deaths
Animal artists
American women sculptors
Artists from Boston
Chevaliers of the Ordre des Arts et des Lettres
Art Students League of New York alumni
People from Redding, Connecticut
20th-century American sculptors
20th-century American women artists
20th-century American painters
National Sculpture Society members
Sculptors from New York (state)
Sculptors from Massachusetts
Burials at Woodlawn Cemetery (Bronx, New York)
Recipients of the Legion of Honour
Olympic competitors in art competitions
Huntington family
Members of the American Academy of Arts and Letters